St Olaf House is a Grade II* listed building on Tooley Street in the London Borough of Southwark. The house was built on the site of St Olave's Church, Southwark between 1928 and 1932, and is now part of London Bridge Hospital.

History

St Olaf House was built between 1928 and 1932 by Harry Stuart Goodhart-Rendel as a headquarters for the Hay's Wharf Company. The house was built on the site of the demolished St Olave's Church, Southwark, in the art deco style. The building is made out of Portland stone. It is six storeys high, T-shaped, and faces the River Thames. The entrance hall has a terrazzo floor. The outside has 39 terracota panels designed by Frank Dobson. Outside the building, there is also a Dobson designed black and gold mosaic of Olaf II of Norway, who helped protect London from the Danes in 1014, and an inscription about the former St Olave's Church.

Hay's Wharf became disused in 1969. In the 1980s, St Olaf House was purchased by London Bridge Hospital, and is used for consultation rooms and their cardiology department. The house became a Grade II* listed building in 1971, and is part of the Tooley Street conservation area.

References

External links

Grade II* listed buildings in the London Borough of Southwark
Grade II* listed houses in London
Hospital buildings completed in 1932
Art Deco architecture in London
Grade II* listed hospital buildings